Marvel Studios: Assembled is an American anthology television docuseries of specials created for the streaming service Disney+. Produced by Marvel Studios, each special goes behind-the-scenes of a Marvel Cinematic Universe (MCU) television series or film in Phase Four with the creatives, exploring the process of creating each series or film.

The series was first announced in February 2021. Marvel Studios: Assembled premiered on March 12, 2021, with subsequent specials releasing shortly after a Disney+ series' completion or a film's Disney+ release. It received positive responses for showcasing how each project came together, particularly with the technical aspects and franchise connectivity.

Premise 
The series goes behind-the-scenes of a Marvel Cinematic Universe (MCU) Phase Four television series or film with the creatives, exploring the process of creating each series or film.

Background 
Marvel Studios: Assembled was announced in February 2021 as a television documentary series of specials to go behind-the-scenes with an "in-depth examination" of the Marvel Cinematic Universe (MCU) television series and films in the franchise's Phase Four slate of content. Each "making of" special follows the filmmakers and the cast and crew members during the production of each project, with exclusive on-set footage used to compile the specials in the series. Assembled was announced to premiere on March 12, 2021, with a special for WandaVision (2021), with specials for The Falcon and the Winter Soldier (2021), the first season of Loki (2021), and Hawkeye (2021), along with the film Black Widow (2021), also revealed. Later in March, ahead of the premiere of The Falcon and the Winter Soldier, its special was revealed to release on April 30, 2021. Shortly after the premiere of Loki in June, that series' special was revealed to release on July 21, 2021. The first three specials debuted one week after the release of each series' finale. In September 2021, the Black Widow special was revealed to be releasing on October 20, 2021, while a special for What If...? was announced for October 27. In November, a special for Shang-Chi and the Legend of the Ten Rings was announced to be releasing on November 12, 2021, to coincide with the Disney+ release of that film as part of the service's "Disney+ Day" celebration.

In December 2021, it was announced that Hawkeye special would be released on January 19, 2022, though this was moved to February 9, 2022, in January 2022. At the same time, the special for Eternals (2021) was announced to be released on February 16. In April 2022, a special for Moon Knight (2022) was revealed to be releasing on May 11, 2022, ultimately releasing on May 25. In June 2022, a special for Doctor Strange in the Multiverse of Madness (2022) was revealed to be releasing on July 1, 2022, before being pushed back and releasing a week later on July 8. In July, a special for Ms. Marvel (2022) was revealed to be releasing on August 3, 2022. The following month, it was announced that the special for Thor: Love and Thunder (2022) would be released on September 8, 2022, for Disney+ Day. In October, a special for She-Hulk: Attorney at Law (2022) was revealed to be releasing on November 3, 2022. In January 2023, a special for Black Panther: Wakanda Forever (2022) was revealed to be releasing on February 8.

Commentators called Assembled a companion series to fellow Marvel Studios docuseries Marvel Studios: Legends, which releases before a series or film to help inform viewers about relevant events to that series or film, while Hoai-Tran Bui and Ethan Anderton of /Film, and ComicBook.com Charlie Ridgley each noted the similarities to the Disney Gallery: The Mandalorian documentary series for the Disney+ Star Wars series The Mandalorian. Ridgley and Matt Miller at Game Informer noted Assembled allowed Marvel Studios to provide more insight on how their content is produced and answer questions audiences may have regarding them. David Wolinsky of GameSpot felt Assembled was a "promising follow-up" to Marvel's Behind the Mask (2021), a fellow documentary series that showcased the inspiration behind Marvel's comic book heroes.

Specials

Release 
Marvel Studios: Assembled premiered on March 12, 2021, on Disney+. Additional specials are released shortly after a Disney+ series' completion or a film's Disney+ release.

Reception 
With the release of the special for WandaVision, Anderton recalled how Marvel Studios had gone from making the MCU as the "largest episodic experiment ever", according to that series' star Paul Bettany, into a "full fledged success" with its interconnectivity and felt Assembled allowed Marvel Studios to "dive into every aspect" of their upcoming productions, including the "spoiler-filled details" that were kept under wraps. Elaine Low, writing for Variety, said the WandaVision special was a "delightful deep dive" that explored the "massive scale and breadth" of the visual effects used for its episodes and the production design. Lucas Pearce at The People's Movies felt that special was a "great way to close the gap" between that series' finale by showing how it "all came together".

Regarding the special for The Falcon and the Winter Soldier, Anderton felt as that series was more straightforward than WandaVision, it was less compelling or enthralling, but highlighted the technical aspects of that production he found "surprising", such as showcasing the use of real skydivers for some frames, and the use of visual effects for some backgrounds in action scenes and on Sam Wilson's Captain America suit. He particularly highlighted stars Anthony Mackie and Sebastian Stan joking around together and a single take scene of Daniel Brühl in character as Baron Helmut Zemo promoting a Sokovian clothing store called Suit-kovia for a "makeshift commercial", which was filmed at the Brass Monkey nightclub set that was used for the series' Madripoor setting.

Related documentaries 
In November 2022, the documentary special Director by Night was released, going behind the scenes of the Marvel Studios Special Presentation Werewolf by Night (2022) with an emphasis on the life and career of its director and composer Michael Giacchino.

Notes

References

External links 
  at Marvel.com
 
 

2020s American anthology television series
2020s American documentary television series
2021 American television series debuts
American anthology television series
American documentary television series
Disney+ original programming
English-language television shows
Marvel Cinematic Universe television series
Television series about filmmaking
Television series by Marvel Studios